ACME Communications was a U.S.-based broadcasting company that was involved in operations of television stations and programming from the late 1990s to the year of 2013.

Company profile 
ACME Communications was co-founded by Chairman and original CEO Jamie Kellner, who previously served as a Fox Television Network executive and was founding CEO of The WB Television Network. Kellner used the name ACME as a play on the fictional Acme Corporation featured in Warner Bros' Wile E. Coyote and Road Runner animated film series and other Looney Tunes media. In 2000, ACME Communications and Paramount Stations Group made a joint partnership. ACME will air UPN programs on WB affiliates, while WB programs appear on UPN's Columbus and Providence markets.

The ownership portfolio of ACME Communications included television stations generally located in medium-sized U.S. media markets, all of which ACME obtained through acquisitions (save for one station in Knoxville that the company built from the ground up). All but one of ACME's stations were affiliated with The WB or converted to WB affiliation at purchase, likely playing on Kellner's previous relationship with that network. The ACME WB stations were among the first to line up affiliations with The CW Television Network when The WB and UPN amalgamated in 2006;. ACME's station portfolio reached a peak of 11 stations in the early 2000s, at which time ACME also ventured into program production with the 2002 launch of The Daily Buzz, a syndicated daily morning news and information program that reached 180 markets at one point.

During the early 2010s, ACME set forth on cost-cutting efforts involving its assets and an admitted "exit strategy" from the television business, including the following:
A licensing and consulting agreement with Fisher Communications for The Daily Buzz, announced in April 2010, that would see Fisher handle production of Buzz.
A June 2010 agreement with LIN TV Corporation (with intent to purchase) involving stations in two markets where the companies had common ownership (Dayton, and Green Bay-Fox Cities), where the LIN stations would provide operational, administrative, and joint sales services for the ACME stations. At the same time, LIN TV also entered into an agreement to provide some services (including third-party accounting) for ACME's duopoly in Albuquerque.
A reduction and restructuring of its corporate staff, set forth in July 2010, that would see Jamie Kellner remain as company chairman but Doug  taking over Keller's titles of President and CEO. Stan Gill, Vice President and General Manager of ACME's KWBQ-KASY duopoly in Albuquerque-Santa Fe, became COO while WBDT, Dayton, Ohio, Vice President and General Manager John Hannon was elevated to ACME's Executive Vice President.
The sales of its last remaining stations: single stations in Dayton, Green Bay, Knoxville (all 3 in sales consummated in Spring 2011), and Madison (a February 2012 sale); as well as an Albuquerque/Santa Fe duopoly (September 2012).
The sale of The Daily Buzz to Mojo Brands Media in April 2013, which left ACME with no remaining broadcast assets and put the company into a closedown mode; ACME officially folded operations once it closed its outstanding accounts in December 2016. The Daily Buzz itself was abruptly canceled April 17, 2015, when a Mojo Brands investor pulled their funding for the series.

Formerly owned assets

Programming 
The Daily Buzz, a 3-hour-per-weekday morning news and information program geared towards young adult audiences. The show launched in 2002 from the studios of ACME-owned WBDT in Dayton, and from 2007 onward would originate from the studios of Full Sail University in Winter Park, Florida. The show was sold to Mojo Brands Media in April 2013, and was cancelled in April 2015. The show was revived in June 2017, but is now broadcast weekly.

Television stations 
Stations are arranged in alphabetical order by state and city of license. With one exception, all the below listed stations were affiliates of The CW or its predecessor, The WB, during ACME Communications' ownership. The exception, KASY-TV, was affiliated with UPN and MyNetworkTV (and was briefly an independent), and was part of a duopoly with an ACME-owned WB/CW affiliate.

Notes

References 

Defunct television broadcasting companies of the United States
Entertainment companies based in California
Mass media in Orange County, California
Companies based in Santa Ana, California
Defunct companies based in Greater Los Angeles
Mass media companies established in 1998
Mass media companies disestablished in 2016
1998 establishments in California
2016 disestablishments in California
The WB